The R462 road is a regional road in Ireland, located in County Clare and County Galway.

References

Regional roads in the Republic of Ireland
Roads in County Clare
Roads in County Galway